Castelsaraceno is a town and comune in the province of Potenza, in the Southern Italian region of Basilicata.

Nearby the commune is one of the longest footbridges, with length of 586m - Ponte tibetano di Castelsaraceno.

References

Cities and towns in Basilicata